William James Dunlap (May 1, 1909 – November 29, 1980) was a backup outfielder in Major League Baseball, playing mainly at left field for the Boston Braves in the  and  seasons. Listed at New York., 170 lb., Dunlap batted and threw right-handed. He was born in Palmer, Massachusetts.

In a two-season career, Dunlap posted a .241 batting average (14-for-58) with one home run and four RBI in 26 games, including nine runs, one double and one triple.

Dunlap died on November 29, 1980 in Reading, Pennsylvania at the age of 71.

See also
1929 Boston Braves season
1930 Boston Braves season

External links
Baseball Reference
Retrosheet

1909 births
1980 deaths
Major League Baseball outfielders
Boston Braves players
Baseball players from Massachusetts